Elections to Newham London Borough Council were held on 9 May 1968.  The whole council was up for election. Turnout was 22.8%.

Following the election, Labour had 30 councillors out of 60. Five Labour aldermen had been elected at the preceding election, with terms running until 1971. At the first council meeting following the election, five more Labour aldermen were elected, leaving the council in Labour hands again.

Background
A total of 145 candidates stood in the election for the 60 seats being contested across 24 wards. 2 seats in one ward had only 2 candidates, thus they were both elected unopposed. Candidates included a full slate from the Labour party, while the Liberal and Conservative parties stood 20 and 27 respectively. Other candidates included 26 Residents & Ratepayers, 6 Communists and 4 Independents.

Election result

|}

Results by ward

Beckton

Bemersyde

Canning Town & Grange

Castle

Central

Custom House & Silvertown

Forest Gate

Greatfield

Hudsons

Kensington

Little Ilford

Manor Park

New Town

Ordnance

Park

Plaistow

Plashet

St Stephens

South

Stratford

Upton

Wall End

West Ham

Woodgrange

By-elections between 1968 and 1971

West Ham

South

References

1968
1968 London Borough council elections